Longstowe is a civil parish and small rural village of nearly 200 residents in South Cambridgeshire, England,  west of Cambridge. The population was measured at 205 at the 2011 census. It is situated on the western side of the A1198 road (Ermine Street), running for about a mile along the B1046.

History
Seventeen people were counted at Longstowe for the 1086 Domesday Book. An area known as 'Town Green' around 1800 may have been the centre of the medieval village which had spread to the south by the middle of the 13th century.

Most of Longstowe's woodland had been cleared by the end of the 13th century, although  were held by the lord of the manor in the 16th century, in addition to furze and heath. The manor was purchased by Anthony Cage the elder in 1571, and he established 'a little park for deer and a warren for conies' around the new house. The acreage of the manor's woodland grew by the end of the 18th century. Until inclosure in 1799, agriculture was carried out in three open fields.

The Varsity Line passed through Longstowe parish to the south of the village although the Great North Road was not important to the village; the settlement reached it only in the late 19th century. The Old North Road railway station was built just over the boundary in Bourn parish and opened in 1862 and encouraged development in the east of the parish.

Longstowe once had three pubs although only the Red House now remains. The Three Horseshoes Inn, built in 1865 and closed in 2001, was renamed after Golden Miller, the Cheltenham Gold Cup and Grand National-winning racehorse which was trained by Basil Briscoe at Longstowe Hall.

In 1801, 175 people lived in the parish; the number rose to 296 in 1891 but dropped again to 218 by 1961.

Governance
Longstowe is represented on the South Cambridgeshire District Council by two councillors for the Gamlingay ward and on Cambridgeshire County Council by one councillor for the Gamlingay electoral division. It is in the parliamentary constituency of South Cambridgeshire in the House of Commons.

Geography
Longstowe is 12 miles (19 km) west of the county town of Cambridge, 11 miles (18 km) south-west of Huntingdon and 47 miles (75 km) north of London. The eastern boundary is marked by the A1198, formerly the Roman Ermine Street (or Old North Road), along which Arrington lies to the south and Caxton to the north. The parish borders Great Gransden in Huntingdonshire. The B1046 runs through Longstowe from Little Gransden in the west to Bourn in the east.

The parish has an area of 1,537 acres (622 hectares) and ranges in height from 50 metres above sea level in the east, to 79 metres in the south-west. The soil is heavy clay with a subsoil of strong clay. It was said in the 17th century that the village was 'unhappy for the want of good water... having neither springs nor brooks to supply that defect'.

Demography
At the time of the 2001 census, Longstowe had 193 residents living in 73 households. All described themselves as White; 73.6% were Christian and 26.4% did not follow a religion or did not state one.

Landmarks
Longstowe Hall is an ancient mansion purchased in the reign of Queen Elizabeth I by the Cage family, who rebuilt it; it was acquired by William Arthur Briscoe in 1906. It stands in a park of about 175 acres (70 hectares) and is now used as a venue for weddings. A lych gate near the church lists the names of the Longstowe men who served in World War I; 'RIP' is inscribed next to the names of those who died.

Religious sites
The parish church is dedicated to St Mary the Virgin and is set back from the road. The current brick building was built in 1863–1864 on the site of the original church which blew down in 1719. The church comprises a chancel, nave, north chapel, south porch and a low embattled western tower containing one bell.

The west window was erected by Mrs. Rushton in memory of her three brothers; she presented a peal of six tubular bells in 1898; after her death two others were added in 1903 as a memorial to her. The small chapel on the north side was built by Captain Sidney Stanley; the stained glass east window is a memorial to John Sharp of Manchester and his wife, Dorothea, and was presented by their children in 1864. In 1904 a memorial window was erected to Mrs. Sharp. The oak lych gate was erected in 1896 by the widow of the Rev. James Rushton M.A., who was rector at Longstowe between 1852 and 1895. A rood was erected in 1920 as a memorial to Longstowe men who were killed in World War I.

Recreation
The village supports a successful cricket club with both A and B teams competing in the Cambridgeshire leagues.

References

External links

Villages in Cambridgeshire
Civil parishes in Cambridgeshire
South Cambridgeshire District